François Marcela-Froideval (born 10 December 1958) is a French role-playing game creator, video game producer, and comic scenarist.

Froideval had a major influence on the introduction of role-playing games in France, mainly as editor in chief of the Casus Belli role-playing magazine. During this time, he was one of the three authors who established the French term for a "munchkin", Gros Bill, from the nickname of an overly powergaming player once in Froideval's group.

He left for the United States in 1982 to join TSR, Inc., where he worked for four years. His writing contributions include several Advanced Dungeons & Dragons rules and monster manuals in collaboration with Gary Gygax, like Oriental Adventures. Back in France, he focused on translating and publishing TSR games until 1989.

He wrote the scenario of several French videogames, working for Infogrames (Drakkhen) and Cryo Interactive (Dragon Lore series).

In 1989, he wrote the scenario of the first Black Moon Chronicles comic album with drawer Olivier Ledroit. He kept on writing the scenario until the end of the series in 2008.

Froideval dedicated the Black Moon Chronicles series to Gary Gygax in the last album End of Times through these words:

He currently still writes scenarios for Black Moon spin-off series, and other French comic series.

References

External links

Francois Froideval at Black Moon Chronicles Dargaud website 
Francois Froideval at Lambiek
Francois Froideval at Bedetheque 

1958 births
Dungeons & Dragons game designers
French graphic novelists
French scenic designers
Living people